Welles House may refer to:

Gideon Welles House, Glastonbury, Connecticut, listed on the National Register of Historic Places (NRHP) in Hartford County
Welles-Shipman-Ward House, South Glastonbury, Connecticut, listed on the NRHP in Hartford County
Larom-Welles Cottage, Saranac Lake, New York, listed on the NRHP in Franklin County
Paul and Ellen Welles House, Raleigh, North Carolina, listed on the NRHP in Wake County
Ellen and Charles F. Welles House, Wyalusing Township, Pennsylvania, listed on the NRHP in Bradford County

See also
Wells House (disambiguation)